Ronald Clive Kerle (28 December 19155 April 1997) was an Australian Anglican bishop.

Kerle was educated at the University of Sydney and ordained in 1939. His first positions were curacies at St Paul's  Sydney and St Anne's Ryde. He then held incumbencies in Kangaroo Valley and Port Kembla. Later he was General Secretary of the New South Wales branch of the Church Missionary Society and then Archdeacon of Cumberland. From 1956 to 1965 he was Bishop Co-adjutor of Sydney when he became Bishop of Armidale, a position he held for 11 years. His final position  until his retirement in 1982 was as Rector of St Swithun's Pymble.

References

1915 births
University of Sydney alumni
Anglican archdeacons in Australia
20th-century Anglican bishops in Australia
Anglican bishops of Armidale
1997 deaths